The all-time DDR-Oberliga table is a cumulative record of all match results, points, and goals of every team that played in the former East Germany's first division DDR-Oberliga from its inception in 1949 until its dissolution in 1991 following German reunification. It awards two points for a win and one point for a draw, as this was the system in use at the time. The matches of the transition round made necessary by the adoption of a Soviet-style calendar year schedule in 1955 are not included. In its final season (1990–91), the competition was known as the NOFV-Oberliga, before becoming part of the German Football Association (DFB).

Although Berliner FC Dynamo are record champions, winning a total of 10 titles, FC Carl Zeiss Jena lead the ranking by points. Wismut Aue, however, hold the record for most seasons, 38. Altogether, 44 clubs competed in the DDR-Oberliga during its history.

Frequent club name changes were a characteristic of East German football and clubs are shown here by the name they last competed under in their final DDR-Oberliga seasons. All other names used by a club when they were part of the DDR-Oberliga are given, but name changes made outside first division play and following German reunification are not shown; see articles on individual clubs for more information.

The all-time table of the DDR-Oberliga:

 Current division as of 2020–21 season.

See also 
All-time Bundesliga table
List of football clubs in East Germany

References

External links
 DDR-Fußball-Ewige Tabelle All-time DDR-Oberliga table at the DFB website
 Die Ewige Tabelle All-time DDR-Oberliga table at Fussballdaten.de
 Oberliga .:. Ewige Tabelle All-time DDR-Oberliga table at Weltfussball.de
 Das deutsche Fußball-Archiv historical German domestic league tables 

DDR-Oberliga
All-time football league tables